The following is a list of Eastern Illinois Panthers football seasons for the football team that has represented Eastern Illinois University in NCAA competition.

Seasons

References 

 
Lists of college football seasons
Eastern Illinois Panthers football seasons